Campo de Ciudad Lineal was a multi-use stadium in Madrid, Spain. It was initially used as the stadium of Real Madrid. It was replaced by Estadio Chamartín in 1924. The capacity of the stadium was 8,000 spectators.

External links

 Estadios de España 

Ciudad Lineal
Real Madrid CF
Former sports venues in Madrid
Sports venues completed in 1910
1910 establishments in Spain
Velodromes in Spain